Salvador Brotons (born 1959 in Barcelona) is a Spanish composer, conductor, and flautist.

Early life  
In the year of 1967, Salvador Brotons attended the Barcelona Conservatory of Music where he received titles in his three areas of studies, which consisted of conducting, composition, and flute. Ten years later in 1977, he was then made the principal flautist of the Orquestra Ciutat de Barcelona. Later in 1985, Brotons left Spain to go to study at the Florida State University through the Fulbright Scholarship, from which he received his Doctorate in Music. Brotons later moved out west to both teach and conduct at Portland State University in Oregon. Here, he taught music literature and history, as well as orchestral conducting. From 1987-97, he also conducted for the Portland State University Symphony Orchestra.

Works and awards 
So far, throughout his life, Brotons has composed 143 works and 16  recordings. Brotons mainly produces works for orchestras and chamber ensembles. In the year 1977, he received his first award of the Premio Orquesta Nacional de España, for his Cuatro Piezas para Cuerdas. He later received the Premio Ciutat de Barcelona for his very first symphony in 1983, and for Absències in 1986. Also in the year of 1986, he received the Southeastern Composers League Award for his Sinfonietta de Camara. Shortly after, Brotons received the Madison University Flute Choir Composition Award for his piece Flute Suit in 1987, and the Premio Reina Sofia de Composición in 1991 for his Virtus of Orchestra. Recordings of Salvador Brotons' works have been released by labels like Naxos, EMI, Albany Records, RNE, and Harmonia Mundi. Much of his music has been published under the music company he founded in 2001, Brotons & Mercadal. He has also conducted in Israel, France, Germany, China, Poland, Uruguay, South Korea, Mexico, and Columbia.

Personal life 
Since 2001, Brotons has been teaching and conducting at the Escola Superior de Música de Catalunya. He currently lives in Barcelona with his wife, Dr. Melissa Brotons, who was once a music therapist.

References 

1959 births
Living people
People from Barcelona
Spanish composers
Spanish male composers
Spanish conductors (music)
Male conductors (music)
Spanish flautists
21st-century conductors (music)
21st-century male musicians
21st-century flautists